Lampersdorf may refer to the following places:

in the Czech Republic:
Lampersdorf, the German name for Lampertice, a village in Trutnov District

in Poland:
Lampersdorf, the German name for Grodziszcze, Ząbkowice Śląskie County, a village in Ząbkowice Śląskie County
Lampersdorf, the German name for Mikowice, Opole_Voivodeship, a village in Namysłów County
Lampersdorf, the German name for Zaborów, Lower Silesian Voivodeship, a village in Lubin County